Goda may refer to:

Names 

 a Lithuanian female name meaning “to have a sense, to perceive". Lithuanian word “goda” also means "honor, glory, respect"
 Devin Goda (born 1989), an American male model and former professional football player 
 a hypocorism of various Germanic given names in God-
 Goda of England (Godgifu) (c. 1004 - c. 1049), 11th-century English princess
 a surname derived from a given name in God-, found in Germany and Hungary
 Krisztina Goda (b. 1970), Hungarian film director
 Gōda, Japanese surnames 合田 or 郷田 connected to "rice paddies"
 a Sanskrit epithet meaning "cattle-giving"
 Goda Varma "cattle-giver protector", a title given to the firstborn son by the nobility of the south Indian Kingdom of Conchin in the 16th and 17th centuries
 Kuno Goda, a pseudonym used by a German artist

People 

 Goda-ikka, a yakuza group
 Godha (a Jain caste)

Places 

 Göda, a municipality in Saxony, Germany
 Goda, Purba Bardhaman, a census town in West Bengal, India
 Godá, the Afar name of the Goda Mountains, Tadjoura Region in Djibouti

Other

 Guild of Drama Adjudicators ("GoDA")
 a concept in Cochrane's Craft or "traditional witchcraft"